Rubia Syed (born on 10 May 1994) is an Indian cricketer. She hails from Anantnag, located in Jammmu and represented Jammu & Kashmir Cricket Association (JKCA).

References

1994 births
Living people
People from Anantnag
Cricketers from Jammu and Kashmir
Sportswomen from Jammu and Kashmir
Jammu and Kashmir cricketers
Kashmiri people
Indian women cricketers